Belleek may refer to:

 Belleek, County Fermanagh, a village and civil parish in County Fermanagh, Northern Ireland
Belleek Pottery, the village's major industry
 Belleek, County Armagh, a townland in County Armagh, Northern Ireland (also known as Belleeks).
 Belleek, County Mayo, an estate outside Ballina